"City Lights" is a song performed by Belgian singer Blanche. The song represented Belgium in the Eurovision Song Contest 2017, and it finished in 4th place in the grand final on 13 May 2017. The song was intended to be released as a digital download on 8 March 2017 through PIAS Belgium, but leaked through Spotify the night before.

Release
While Blanche's song "City Lights" had been previously announced to be released on 8 March 2017, the song leaked the night before through Spotify. It was released as a digital download on 8 March.

Eurovision Song Contest

On 22 November 2016, it was announced that Blanche would be representing Belgium at the Eurovision Song Contest 2017. Belgium competed at the Eurovision Song Contest's first half of the first semi-final that took place on 9 May 2017, and finished 4th, gaining enough points to compete in the final. Belgium ended up with 363 points on 4th place in the Grand Final, receiving 12 points from Ireland's jury and the televote in Estonia, Poland, Latvia and Sweden.

Charts

Weekly charts

Year-end charts

Certifications

Release history

References

Eurovision songs of Belgium
Eurovision songs of 2017
2017 songs
2017 debut singles
Blanche (singer) songs
English-language Belgian songs
PIAS Recordings singles
Ultratop 50 Singles (Flanders) number-one singles
Songs written by Pierre Dumoulin (songwriter)
Songs written by Blanche (singer)